Bashkir (Bashqortsa,  Bashqort tele, or Başqortsa / Başqort tele) is a Turkic language belonging to the Kipchak branch. It is co-official with Russian in Bashkortostan. It is spoken by approximately 1.4 million native speakers in Russia, as well as in Ukraine, Belarus, Kazakhstan, Uzbekistan, Estonia and other neighboring post-Soviet states, and among the Bashkir diaspora. It has three dialect groups: Southern, Eastern and Northwestern.

Speakers

Speakers of Bashkir mostly live in the republic of Bashkortostan (a republic within the Russian Federation). Many speakers also live in Tatarstan, Chelyabinsk, Orenburg, Tyumen, Sverdlovsk and Kurgan Oblasts and other regions of Russia. Minor Bashkir groups also live in Kazakhstan and other countries.

Classification
Bashkir together with Tatar belongs to the Bulgaric subgroups of the Kipchak languages. They share the same vocalism and the vowel shifts (see below) that make both languages stand apart from most other Kipchak and Oghuz Turkic languages.

However, Bashkir differs from Tatar in several important ways:
The only other Turkic language with a similar feature is Turkmen.
 The word-initial and morpheme-initial  is turned into . An example of both features can be Tatar сүз süz  and Bashkir һүҙ hüź , both meaning "word".
 Common Turkic  (Tatar ) is turned into Bashkir , e.g., Turkish ağaç , Tatar агач aghach  and Bashkir ағас ağas , all meaning "tree".
However, the eastern and northern dialects of Bashkir have the  > /~/ shift.

Labial vowel harmony in Bashkir is written explicitly, e.g. Tatar тормышым tormïshïm and Bashkir тормошом tormoshom, both pronounced , meaning "my life".

Orthography

After the adoption of Islam, which began in the 10th century and lasted for several centuries, the Bashkirs began to use Turki as a written language. Turki was written in a variant of the Arabic script.

In 1923, a writing system based on the Arabic script was specifically created for the Bashkir language. At the same time, the Bashkir literary language was created, moving away from the older written Turkic influences. At first, it used a modified Arabic alphabet. In 1930 it was replaced with the Unified Turkic Latin Alphabet, which was in turn replaced with an adapted Cyrillic alphabet in 1939.

The modern alphabet used by Bashkir is based on the Russian alphabet, with the addition of the following letters: Ә ә , Ө ө , Ү ү , Ғ ғ , Ҡ ҡ , Ң ң , Ҙ ҙ , Ҫ ҫ , Һ һ .

Phonology

Vowels
Bashkir has nine native vowels, and three or four loaned vowels (mainly in Russian loanwords).

Phonetically, the native vowels are approximately thus (with the Cyrillic letter followed by the usual Latin romanization in angle brackets):

The mid vowels may be transcribed as lowered near-high [, ], and the close front or close central rounded vowel [~] may be transcribed as near-close near-front [].

For example: күл (kül) — [kul], ҡул (qul) — [quɫ]

Historical shifts
Historically, the Old Turkic mid vowels have raised from mid to high, whereas the Old Turkic high vowels have become the Bashkir reduced mid series. (The same shifts have also happened in Tatar.)

Consonants

Notes
The exact place of articulation of the other dental/alveolar consonants is unclear.

Grammar
A member of the Turkic language family, Bashkir is an agglutinative, SOV language. A large part of the Bashkir vocabulary has Turkic roots; and there are many loan words in Bashkir from Russian, Arabic and Persian sources.

Plurality
The form of the plural suffix is heavily dependent on the letter which comes immediately before it. When it's a consonant, there is a four-way distinction between "л" (l), "т" (t), "ҙ" (ź) and "д" (d); The vowel's distinction is two-way between "а" (after back vowels "а" (a), "ы" (ı), "о" (o), "у" (u)) and "ә" (after front vowels "ә" (ä), "е" (e), "и" (i), "ө" (ö), "ү" (ü)). Some nouns are also less likely to be used with their plural forms such as "һыу" (hıw, "water") or "ҡом" (qom, "sand").

Declension table 
Declension of pronouns

References

Further reading

External links

National Corpus of the Bashkir language
Machine fund of the Bashkir language
Spoken corpus of Bashkir (Rakhmetovo and Baimovo) 
 Short grammar of Bashkir

 
Agglutinative languages
Subject–object–verb languages
Kipchak languages
Languages of Kazakhstan
Languages of Russia
Turkic languages
Vowel-harmony languages
Languages written in Cyrillic script